Rachel Hartman (born July 9, 1972 in Kentucky) is an American writer and artist of comics, and an author of young adult fiction. She is known for her books Seraphina (2012), Shadow Scale (2015), Tess of the Road (2018), and In The Serpent's Wake (2022).

Early life
Rachel Hartman was born on July 9, 1972 in Kentucky. She lived in numerous places including Lexington, Kentucky, Chicago, Philadelphia, St. Louis, England, and Japan. she attended Washington University in St. Louis, where she obtained a BA in Comparative Literature.

Career
In 1996, Hartman published her first comic book, Amy Unbounded, the Ashcan Series.

Her first book, Seraphina, received the 2013 William C. Morris Award, awarded to best young adult book published in the US by a debut author and won the 2012 Cybils Award for best young adult fantasy or science fiction novel. Shadow Scale appeared on the New York Times Best Seller List for Young Adult books in its first week of eligibility. Her third novel, Tess of the Road, a companion novel featuring new characters as well as appearances of characters from her first two novels, was released on February 27, 2018., followed in 2022 by the fourth, In The Serpent's Wake.

Personal life
Hartman lives in Vancouver, British Columbia with her husband and son.

Her hobbies include reading, playing role-playing games, dancing, and playing the cello.

References

External links

 
 * 
 
 

1972 births 
Canadian fantasy writers
Canadian writers of young adult literature
Writers from Vancouver 
Living people
Canadian women novelists
The William C. Morris YA Debut Award winners
Washington University in St. Louis alumni